Vittoria Febbi (born February 13, 1939) is an Italian actress and voice actress.

Biography
Born in Eritrea's capital city and raised in Italy, Febbi began her career as a child actress in 1949 starring in Luigi Zampa's Alarm Bells. She also performed the Italian voice of the title character in Alice in Wonderland early in her voice dubbing venture. She ended her acting career in 1960.

Febbi began to focus exclusively on voice acting and dubbing. She is the official Italian voice actress of Kathy Bates, Gena Rowlands, Liv Ullmann and Jessica Lange. She has also dubbed Talia Shire in her last three appearances in the Rocky films as well as Diane Keaton in The Godfather films and since 2006, she has dubbed Susan Flannery in the Italian dubbing of the soap opera The Bold and the Beautiful after the death of Angiolina Quinterno.

Personal life
Febbi is married to Ennio Nobili. Together, they have two children, including dialogue adaptor Federico Nobili, who is in turn the father of voice actress Elisa Nobili.

Filmography

Cinema
Alarm Bells (1949)
Ring Around the Clock (1950)
Revenge of the Pirates (1951)
Tragic Spell (1951)
Cento piccole mamme (1951)
The Golden Coach (1952)
Finishing School (1953)
Città di notte (1958)
Ragazzi della marina (1958)
Promesse di marinaio (1958)
Fury of the Pagans (1960)

Dubbing roles

Animation
Alice in Alice in Wonderland
Aunt Fanny in Robots
Flo in All Dogs Go to Heaven
Mayor McGerkle in The Grinch
Nora Beady in Barnyard
Narrator in The Pebble and the Penguin

Live action
Annie Wilkes in Misery
Bibby Berman in Used People
Grace Beasley in Unconditional Love
Regina Jackson in The Day the Earth Stood Still
Aunt Mitsy in Rumor Has It
Headminister in Boychoir
Dwan in King Kong
Frances Farmer in Frances
Carly Marshall in Blue Sky
Leigh Bowden in Cape Fear
Patsy Cline in Sweet Dreams
Bette in Cousin Bette
Rose Cook Lewis in A Thousand Acres
Helen in Night and the City
Carmen Markowski in Broken Flowers
Kay Adams in The Godfather
Kay Adams in The Godfather Part II
Kay Adams in The Godfather Part III
Adrian Pennino in Rocky III
Adrian Pennino in Rocky IV
Adrian Pennino in Rocky V
Mabel Longhetti in A Woman Under the Influence
Gloria Swenson in Gloria
Georgia King in Something to Talk About
Stephanie Forrester in The Bold and the Beautiful (2006–2013)

References

External links

1939 births
Living people
Actresses from Rome
Eritrean emigrants to Italy
Italian voice actresses
Italian radio actresses
Italian film actresses
Italian child actresses
Italian voice directors
20th-century Italian actresses
21st-century Italian actresses